The Minister of Energy and Petroleum is a cabinet-level position in the Gambia. It was formed in January 2016 by a merger of the positions of Minister of Petroleum and Minister of Energy. The incumbent minister is Fafa Sanyang, who serves in Adama Barrow's cabinet.

History 
The Ministry of Petroleum was responsible for petroleum exploration, as well as the development and production of crude oil in the Gambia. The Ministry of Energy was created in 2007 in order to implement government policy in relation to the supply of electricity, water management, petroleum products and renewable energy. The ministries were merged with effect from the 26 January 2016, to become the Ministry of Energy and Petroleum.

Ministers of Energy and Petroleum, 2017-present 
 Fafa Sanyang, 22 March 2017 - present

Ministers of Petroleum, 1994-present 
 Njogu Bah, 10 June 2013 - 12 June 2013
 Teneng Mba Jaiteh, 2013 - 2014
 Sirra Wally Ndow-Njie, 16 February 2015 - 18 April 2016

Ministers of Energy, 2007-2016 
 Ousman Jammeh, May 2008 - 11 September 2009
 Authority transferred to Office of the President, 11 September 2009 - 22 December 2009
 Sirra Wally Ndow-Njie, 22 December 2009 - 7 June 2010
 Ousman Jammeh, 7 June 2010 - 28 June 2010
 Authority transferred to Office of the President, 28 June 2010 - ?
 Teneng Mba Jaiteh, ? - 12 August 2013
 Authority transferred to Office of the President, 12 August 2013 - 2 September 2013
 Teneng Mba Jaiteh, 2 September 2013 - 17 February 2014
 Vacant, 17 February 2014 - 21 February 2014
 Teneng Mba Jaiteh, 21 February 2014
 Edward Saja Sanneh, 17 June 2014 - 26 January 2016

References 

Lists of government ministers of the Gambia